The Metropolitano championship ("Campeonato Metropolitano") was an Argentine football tournament which existed between 1967 and 1984. The Metropolitano formed one half of the Primera División, taking place in the first half of the year, while the Nacional championship ("Campeonato Nacional") took place in the 2nd half of the year. This arrangement lasted until 1982 when they were reversed. The Metropolitano and Nacional were abandoned to make way for European style seasons beginning in 1985–1986.  

The Metropolitano utilized a number of different formats, including the basic league table, 2 groups qualifying to semi-finals. The number of participants varied between a low of 18 (1972, 1973 and 1981) to a high of 23 (1977)

List of Champions

Notes

Titles by club

Records
River Plate hold the most titles with four, and are the only team to have won two consecutive Metropolitano championships in 1979 and 1980.
Vélez Sársfield are the most successful team never to win the Metropolitano, with 2 second places, a third place and a semi-final place.
Diego Maradona was topscorer in the Metropolitano three times (1978, 1979, 1980) 
The only other player to be topscorer on more than one occasion was Carlos Manuel Morete (1974, 1982)

See also
Argentine Primera División
Nacional championship
Apertura and Clausura
Football in Argentina

External links
RSSSF list of final tables, Argentina

Argentine Primera División
Defunct football leagues in Argentina